The 1982 Yco-Tanduay season was the eighth season of the franchise in the Philippine Basketball Association (PBA).

Transactions

Summary
Last year's Reinforced Filipino Conference best import Russell Murray returns to the Esquires in the first conference of the season. Yco-Tanduay finishes at fifth in the team standings. They were swept in two games by Toyota Super Corollas in the best-of-three quarterfinals. 

In the Open Conference, the Esquires' two imports were 6-11 Jerome Henderson and 6-8 Curtis Berry.  Yco-Tanduay were third behind N-Rich Coffee and Gilbey's Gin after 18 games in the elimination phase. Going into the last playing date of the quarterfinal round on November 23, all four quarterfinalist are tied with one win and one loss each. The Esquires lost to Toyota Super Corollas and were eliminated from the four-team semifinals.

Won-loss records vs Opponents

Roster

References

YCO
Tanduay Rhum Masters seasons